Rabbi Yechezkel Levenstein (Rav Yechezkel HaLevi Levenstein), known as Reb Chatzkel, (1885 – 18 Adar 1974), was the mashgiach ruchani of the Mir yeshiva, in Mir, Belarus and during the yeshiva's flight to Lithuania and on to Shanghai due to the invasion of Poland by Nazi Germany in World War II. He was a leader of several yeshivas in Europe, America, and Israel, and raised several generations of Torah-observant Jewry.  He was a disciple of R' Nachum Zev Ziv son of R' Simcha Zissel Ziv.

Biography
Rabbi Levenstein was born in Warsaw (5656) His mother, Zlota, died when he was just five years old; his father, Reb Yehuda, subsequently remarried.  He studied for  years in the yeshiva in Łomża, where he was imbued with mussar, then in Raduń Yeshiva under the Chofetz Chaim and the famous mashgiach Rav Yeruchom Levovitz, and finally in Kelm.

His rebbetzin, Chaya, was an orphan. He had "rejected glowing offers made to him by wealthy men who wanted him for their daughters" saying they would "be unable to share a life of privation and restraint and of subsisting on the bare essentials."

From 5695 (1935), for about 2 years he served as mashgiach of Yeshivas Lomza in Petach Tikvah, "despite the very difficult, poverty stricken life he led in Petach Tikvah."

His impact was not only on the yeshiva but on some students who became "well known roshei yeshiva."

Shanghai
News reached Shanghai Adar 5703 (1943), where the Mir spent the war years, of the murders of so many of Lithuanian Jewry. The eulogy of the martyrs by the mashgiach was published in a book, Mimizrach Shemesh.

Yeshivos
The Yeshivos that he founded or strongly influenced include:
 Before World War II
 Mir Yeshiva (Poland), as Mashgiach Ruchani
 After the War
 Mir Yeshivah (Yerushalayim) 
 Ponovezh Yeshivah (B'nei Brak)

Works
Or Yechezkel, a seven volume work of musar

Bibliography
 Kasnett, Yitzchak (2007) Reb Chatzkel. Rabbi Yechezkel Levenstein - Guardian of Torah and Mussar, Artscroll Mesorah Publications,

External links
Matzav.com Article
chareidi.org Article

References

Haredi rabbis in Europe
Haredi rabbis in Israel
Mashgiach ruchani
1895 births
1974 deaths
Musar movement
Raduń Yeshiva alumni
Jews who emigrated to escape Nazism
Rabbis from Warsaw
Mir mashgiach ruchanis